William "Ginger" Richard McLennan (5 June 1927 – 21 July 2007) was a New Zealand rugby league footballer who represented New Zealand in the 1954 and 1957 World Cups.

Playing career
Born on the West Coast, McLennan was a miner and represented the West Coast. He played for the Runanga club. He was first selected for New Zealand in 1951. McLennan played in 84 games for the Kiwis, including 28 tests. This included 22 consecutive tests. His total 84 games has been bettered only by Jock Butterfield (99) and Tom Baxter (94).

He was part of the famous Kiwi team that won back-to-back test series against Australia in 1952 (in Australia) and 1953 (in New Zealand).

McLennan was the vice-captain in the 1955-56 tour of Great Britain. He retired after this tour however he made a comeback for the 1957 World Cup.

He was inducted as one of the New Zealand Rugby Leagues "Legends of League" in 2000.

References

2007 deaths
New Zealand rugby league players
New Zealand national rugby league team players
West Coast rugby league team players
1927 births
New Zealand miners
South Island rugby league team players
Blackball players
Rugby league props
Runanga players